Savoy Estate is a suburb of Johannesburg, South Africa. It is located in Region E of the City of Johannesburg Metropolitan Municipality.

History
Prior to the discovery of gold on the Witwatersrand in 1886, the suburb lay on land on one of the original farms called Syferfontein. It became a suburb in October 1948 and was originally owned by M.A. Zoccola who was from the same region of the Savoy Royal family.

References

Johannesburg Region E